Hans Petersen (13 January 1930 – 13 June 2013) was a Danish boxer. He competed at the 1952 Summer Olympics and the 1956 Summer Olympics.

References

External links
 

1930 births
2013 deaths
Danish male boxers
Olympic boxers of Denmark
Boxers at the 1952 Summer Olympics
Boxers at the 1956 Summer Olympics
Light-welterweight boxers
Sportspeople from the Region of Southern Denmark